John Arnst  (3 February 1882 – 25 August 1918) was a New Zealand racing cyclist.

Cycling career

Jack Arnst was one of thirteen children born to Hermann and Catharina Arnst. The family lived at Tai Tapu near Christchurch. He, and his brothers Richard, Herman and Bill (William), became champion cyclists both on the road and on the track. Some of the credit of this win was due to his brother Richard's unselfish pacing, who finished in 5th place in the second fastest time, that was also inside the previous best time. The brothers returned to Australia in 1904 with Richard finishing in 10th and Jack well back in 25th. In 1905 Jack could only manage 76th with Richard in 77th.

On the brothers second trip to Australia in 1904 they raced in the Goulburn to Sydney Classic with Jack finishing 2nd and setting the fastest time, and Richard finishing 12th. Jack again set the fastest time in 1905, finishing 15th while Richard suffered with cramps.

Christchurch to Dunedin record
On 14 April 1909 Jack Arnst created a new cycling time record over the Christchurch to Dunedin road, a distance which was at that time two hundred and forty-seven miles. Rough shingle roads and unbridged streams and rivers made for hard going but he covered the distance in 12 hours and 31 minutes. His brother, Richard Arnst, and another person paced the rider on motorcycles, and a car followed carrying food and spares. The record was never recognized officially as the Arnst team had failed to include an observer from the League of Wheelmen who controlled such matters. However nobody ever made a faster run until such time as the road conditions were improved and the distance somewhat shortened with road realignment.

War service and death
Arnst enlisted with the New Zealand Expeditionary Force and served as a private with the Canterbury Regiment. He was killed in action at Bapaume on 25 August 1918 during the Second Battle of Bapaume and is buried at Grévillers British Cemetery.
His name appears on three war memorials in New Zealand: one at Takapau, Hawkes Bay; one at Spotswood, North Canterbury; and on a World War I honours board inside the Ladbrooks community hall, near where he grew up.

Major results

1902
3rd and 3rd fastest time Timaru to Christchurch Road Race
1903
1st and fastest time Melbourne to Warrnambool Classic (Australasian Championship)
2nd and fastest time Timaru to Christchurch Road Race
1904
2nd and fastest time Goulburn to Sydney
25th and 15th fastest time Melbourne to Warrnambool Classic
1905
 15th and fastest time Goulburn to Sydney 
1906
3rd fastest time Timaru to Christchurch Road Race
1909
12th and fastest time Timaru to Christchurch Road Race

References

Richard Arnst - The Single Sculls World Champion From New Zealand. Published Christchurch 2005.

External resources
Jack Arnst Profile on Cycling Ranking.

1882 births
1918 deaths
New Zealand male cyclists
People from Tai Tapu
New Zealand military personnel killed in World War I
New Zealand Military Forces personnel of World War I
New Zealand Army soldiers
Sportspeople from Canterbury, New Zealand